The Wallace Carnegie Library, in Wallace, Idaho, was built in 1911.  It was listed on the National Register of Historic Places in 1981.

It is located at 415 River St. in what is now City Park?

It is a one-story brick Carnegie library built upon a high basement in English Renaissance Revival style.  Its entrance is through a portico with Ionic columns at the top of a flight of concrete steps.

References

External links

Carnegie libraries in Idaho
National Register of Historic Places in Shoshone County, Idaho
Renaissance Revival architecture in Idaho
Library buildings completed in 1911
Individually listed contributing properties to historic districts on the National Register in Idaho